Horbaef (also known as Baefhor and Horbaf) was an ancient Egyptian prince of the 4th Dynasty. His title was "King’s son".

Horbaef was a son of Pharaoh Khufu and an unknown woman. He married his half-sister Meresankh II, and they had two daughters, the ladies Nefertkau III and Nebty-tepites. They may have also had one son called Djaty. After Horbaef’s death, his widow Meresankh married a pharaoh, her other half-brother, either Djedefra or Khafre, and thus she became a queen. It’s possible that Djaty was a son of Meresankh’s second husband because he had a title "king’s son of his body", and Horbaef was a prince but never a king.

Horbaef was buried in the mastaba G 7410-7420 at Giza. Meresankh was also buried there.

References 

Aidan Dodson & Dyan Hilton, The Complete Royal Families of Ancient Egypt, Thames & Hudson (2004)

Princes of the Fourth Dynasty of Egypt
3rd-millennium BC births
3rd-millennium BC deaths
Khufu